Song Zhiwei (Chinese: 宋志伟; Pinyin: Sòng Zhìwěi; born 19 March 1989 in Dalian) is a Chinese football player who currently plays for Chinese Super League side Dalian Professional.

Club career
Song joined Zhejiang Green Town youth team system from Dalian Shide in 2006. He started his professional football career in 2007 when he was sent to Hangzhou Sanchao (Zhejiang Green Town youth team) for China League Two campaign. In July 2007, he moved to Portuguese side S.L. Benfica for a brief trial. He made a free transfer to League Two side Chongqing F.C. in 2011. He scored his first goal for Chongqing on 25 June 2011, in a 2–2 draw against Guangdong Youth. He made 14 appearances as Chongqing won promotion to the second tier at the end of the 2011 season. Due to lingering injury, he played just one league match and one FA Cup match in the 2012 season. In January 2013, Song moved back to Hangzhou Greentown on a free transfer. On 25 May 2013, he made his Super League debut in a 1–0 home defeat against Guangzhou Evergrande.

On 9 January 2014, Song transferred to China League One side Wuhan Zall with a fee of ¥600,000. He would be an integral member of the team and help gain promotion with them to the top tier by winning the 2018 China League One division. After being an integral member of the team that helped the club establish themselves as a top tier club he would leave the team on 21 April 2022 to join another top tier club Dalian Professional for the start of the 2022 Chinese Super League season. He made  his debut in a league game on 16 June 2022 against Zhejiang Professional in a match that ended in a 1-1 draw.

Career statistics 
Statistics accurate as of match played 31 December 2020.

Honours

Club
Wuhan Zall
 China League One: 2018

References

External links
 

1989 births
Living people
Association football defenders
Chinese footballers
Footballers from Dalian
Zhejiang Professional F.C. players
Wuhan F.C. players
Chinese Super League players
China League One players
China League Two players